SP-100 (Space reactor Prototype) was a U.S. research program for nuclear fission reactors usable as small fission power systems for spacecraft. It was started in 1983 by NASA, the US Department of Energy and other agencies.

A reactor was developed with heat pipes transporting the heat to thermoelectric generators. It was cooled with lithium.
The project never advanced to flight hardware and was terminated in 1994.

See also 
 Systems Nuclear Auxiliary Power Program and SNAP-10A, that flew in 1965
 Safe Affordable Fission Engine, a later project
 Kilopower, a later small space reactor

References 

Nuclear power in space